Yavor Bozhilov Notev is a Bulgarian politician, member of the Bulgarian political party "Attack." He is a deputy in the 43rd National Assembly of Bulgaria.

Biography
Yavor Notev was born on 10 July 1957 in Sofia. He graduated in law at Sofia University "St. Kliment Ohridski". Five years working as an investigator in the department for the investigation of serious accidents and catastrophes. Since 1988, a lawyer from the Sofia college and working on criminal cases. MP from Attack in the 41st, 42nd, vice president of the 43rd National Assembly, Deputy Chairman of the Committee on Legal Affairs and the first rotating Chairman of the Subcommittee control SIMs. Candidate for mayor of the town. Sofia in 2015, a candidate for Vice President of the Republic of Bulgaria Ataka in 2016 Bulgarian presidential election, paired with the presidential candidate of VMRO Krasimir Karakachanov. The couple received the support of the parliamentary parties of the Patriotic Front - and NFSB VMRO and Ataka.

References

1957 births
Living people
Politicians from Sofia
Members of the National Assembly (Bulgaria)
Bulgarian nationalists